Bangladesh Institute of Governance and Management is a research and training institute for government and private officers  providing post-graduate degrees. It is governed by a Board of Trustees led by Mohammed Matiul Islam, chairperson of the institute. Mohammad Tareque is the director of the institute.

History
Bangladesh Institute of Governance and Management was established in 2006. It was originally called  Civil Service College, Dhaka. The institute offers Masters in Public Affairs. Majors in the institute are governance and public policy, human resource management, and international economic relations. The institute moved from BIAM Foundation to a permanent campus at Agargaon, Dhaka.

Bangladesh Institute of Governance and Management carries research and studies on topics relevant to Bangladesh. It carried out research on the COVID-19 pandemic in Bangladesh and its impact on working women.

References

2006 establishments in Bangladesh
Organisations based in Dhaka
Research institutes in Bangladesh